Football Club Saint-Lô Manche is a French association football club founded in 1965. They are based in the town of Saint-Lô and their home stadium is the Stade Louis Villemer, which has a capacity of 5,000 spectators. As of the 2017–18 season, the club plays in the Championnat National 3.

Players

Current squad

References

External links
https://www.fcsaintlo.com/ FC Saint-Lô official website] 

Saint-Lô
Association football clubs established in 1965
1965 establishments in France
Saint-Lô
Saint-Lô